Didimus laevis is a species of Beetle in the family Passalidae.

Description
Body is elongate-cylindrical and black overall. The head is narrower than the thorax. The elytra are elongate with almost parallel sides, and heavily striated.

Distribution
This species is present in São Tomé and Príncipe.

References

Passalidae
Beetles described in 1835